The Men's madison competition at the 2020 UCI Track Cycling World Championships was held on 1 March 2020.

Results
The race was started at 15:03. 200 laps (50 km) with 20 sprints were raced.

References

Men's madison
UCI Track Cycling World Championships – Men's madison